Aeromonas caviae is a Gram-negative bacterium of the genus Aeromonas isolated from epizootic guinea pigs.

References

External links
Type strain of Aeromonas caviae at BacDive -  the Bacterial Diversity Metadatabase

Aeromonadales
Bacteria described in 1984